Schistura chapaensis is a species of ray-finned fish in the stone loach genus Schistura from north western Vietnam.

References 

C
Fish described in 1944